Island Cove was a small place in Trinity Bay, Newfoundland and Labrador, Canada that has now been resettled. The Way Office was established in 1864 and the first Waymaster was John Crane. It changed to Post Office status in 1891.

See also
 List of communities in Newfoundland and Labrador

Ghost towns in Newfoundland and Labrador